Nicolai is a given name. Notable persons with that name include:

Nicolai Borger, German writer, actor and director
Nicolai Gedda (1925–2017), Swedish operatic tenor
Nicolai Jørgensen (born 1991), Danish footballer
Nicolai Kielstrup (born 1991), Danish singer
Nicolai Lomov (1946–2020), Russian classical pianist
Nicolai Tangen (born 1966), Norwegian hedge fund manager

See also

Nicolay (disambiguation)
Nikolay (disambiguation)
Nikolaj
Nikolai (disambiguation)
Niccolai
Nickolai Stoilov
Nicola (name)
Nicolae (name)
Nicolaj
Nicolao
Nicolas (given name)
Nicolau
Nicolau (surname)
Nicolay

Danish masculine given names